Teemu Tallberg is a Finnish professional ice hockey forward who currently plays for HIFK of the Liiga.

External links

Living people
HIFK (ice hockey) players
Year of birth missing (living people)
Finnish ice hockey forwards